The Deep Dark Woods are a Canadian folk band from Saskatoon, currently signed to Sugar Hill Records in the United States and Six Shooter Records in Canada.

History
First established in 2005, the band consisted of singer and guitarist Ryan Boldt, bass guitarist Chris Mason, guitarist Burke Barlow and drummer Lucas Goetz. Pianist and organist Geoff Hilhorst joined the group in 2009 after the release of their breakout album Winter Hours. Founding member Burke Barlow played guitar until 2012 when he left the group and was replaced by Clayton Linthicum. Founding Member Lucas Goetz left the group in late 2014, after which the band went on hiatus. In 2017 Chris Mason officially left the group.

They have released seven albums to date, and contributed an original song, "Charlie's (Is Coming Down)", to CBC Radio 2's Great Canadian Song Quest in 2009. Their fourth record, The Place I Left Behind, was released in Canada on Six Shooter Records in August 2011, and internationally on Sugar Hill Records on October 18, 2011. The band's fifth album, Jubilee was released on September 30, 2013 through Sugar Hill Records. The latest, Yarrow, was released on October 27, 2017 and was nominated for a Juno Award for Contemporary Roots Album of the Year category in 2019.

Boldt has also released one album, Broadside Ballads, as a solo artist independently of the band.

Discography
 The Deep Dark Woods (2006)
 Hang Me, Oh Hang Me (2007)
 Winter Hours (2009)
 The Place I Left Behind (2011)
 Jubilee (2013)
 Yarrow (2017)
 Love Is Pleasing + The Tide Was Flowing b/w Lone Pilgrim (single) (2018)
 Changing Faces (2021)

Awards and nominations

References

External links
 

Musical groups established in 2005
Musical groups from Saskatoon
Canadian alternative country groups
Six Shooter Records artists
Sugar Hill Records artists
2005 establishments in Saskatchewan
Canadian indie folk groups
Canadian Folk Music Award winners
Black Hen Music artists